Type 17 may refer to:

F.B.A. Type 17, a training flying boat produced in France in the 1920s
Shansi Type 17, a Chinese made version of the Mauser C96
Bugatti Type 17, a Bugatti car
Bristol Type 17, a British two-seat biplane fighter and reconnaissance aircraft
Nieuport Type 17, a French biplane fighter aircraft of World War I
Polikarpov I-16 Type 17, a Soviet fighter aircraft of revolutionary design
Albatros B.II Type 17, an unarmed German two-seat reconnaissance biplane

See also

 
 Type (disambiguation)
 T17 (disambiguation)
 17 (disambiguation)
 Class 17 (disambiguation)
 Model 17 (disambiguation)